QuickDEX is a free form database software application first released by Casady & Greene for the classic Mac OS. An update, QuickDEX II was released and the product eventually became InfoGenie and then iData Pro. The purpose of this software is to store text data that doesn't fit into more rigid database structures. QuickDEX and its successors featured an extremely fast search, phone dialing, as well as label and envelope printing. InfoGenie and iData Pro 1.0 added the ability to have user-defined fields in a record along with the freeform text area.

Since the closing of Casady & Greene, Inc., iData has been taken over by Mike Wright and Robin Casady. It is currently available from iDataPartners.com and a new version has been written for Mac OS X. iData Pro expands on its predecessors by adding (among many other features) the ability to have styled text, images, and sound files in the freeform text area. 

There is also a version available for the iPhone, iPad, and iPod Touch through iTunes. It is called iData Mobile Plus.

References

Macintosh-only software